Mike Craig (born November 1, 1962) is a Canadian former professional ice hockey goaltender. He was selected by the Buffalo Sabres in the 10th round (205th overall) of the 1982 NHL Entry Draft.

Early life 
Craig was born in Calgary, Alberta. As a junior, he played with the Calgary Canucks in the Alberta Junior Hockey League (AJHL), where he won the AJHL Marsh Trophy (shared with Mike Vernon) for the goaltenders of the team with the fewest goals scored against it during the regular season.

Career 
Craig played major junior hockey in the Western Hockey League (WHL) with the Calgary Wranglers, where he also shared netminding duties with Mike Vernon. He then played with the WHL's Billings Bighorns and the University of Calgary before turning professional in 1984 with the Rochester Americans of the American Hockey League (AHL). In his three professional seasons, Craig played 99 games with the Americans, and 10 games in the International Hockey League (IHL). He retired following the 1986–87 season.

Awards and honours

References

External links

1962 births
Living people
Billings Bighorns players
Buffalo Sabres draft picks
Calgary Canucks players
Calgary Dinos ice hockey players
Calgary Wranglers (WHL) players
Canadian ice hockey goaltenders
Flint Generals players
Flint Spirits players
Rochester Americans players
Ice hockey people from Calgary